Cyrtodactylus zhaoermii is a species of gecko, a lizard in the family Gekkonidae. The species is endemic to the Tibet Autonomous Region of China.

Etymology
The specific name, zhaoermii, is in honor of Chinese herpetologist Zhao Er-Mi.

Habitat

Reproduction
The mode of reproduction of C. zhaoermii is unknown.

References

Further reading
Shi L, Zhao H (2010). "A new species of Cyrtodactylus (Reptilia: Squamata: Gekkonidae) from Xizang Autonomous Region, China". Zootaxa 2336: 51–60. (Cyrtodactylus zhaoermii, new species).

Cyrtodactylus
Reptiles described in 2010